Atalaia is a municipality in the Brazilian state of Alagoas.

References

Municipalities in Alagoas